Jabil Inc. is an American worldwide manufacturing services company.  Headquartered in the Gateway area of St. Petersburg, Florida, it is one of the largest companies in the Tampa Bay area.  Jabil has around 100 plants in 30 countries, and 260,000 employees worldwide.

History
The company's name derives from the first names of James Golden and William (Bill) E. Morean, who together founded the company in 1966. Jabil was formally incorporated in Detroit, Michigan, in 1969.  One of the early products it manufactured was PCBs.

In the 1980s, the company was making parts for PC companies like Dell, and this continued through the mid-1990s.

The company went public in 1993. In 1998, Jabil began trading publicly on the New York Stock Exchange under ticker symbol JBL. The company was then added to the S&P 500 Index in 2001. In 2014, the company was moved from the S&P 500 Index to the S&P MidCap 400 Index. 

On March 1, 2013, Jabil appointed William E. Peters as president and William D. Muir Jr. as chief operating officer. Both had been with Jabil for more than 20 years. On the same day, Mark Mondello was appointed CEO, replacing Timothy Main, elected chairman of the board of directors. The appointments were sparked by the retirement of board chairman William D. Morean, the son of one of the Jabil founders.

In 2017, Jabil announced that it would be closing its first European international plant in Livingston, UK, by the end of the year. Two hundred sixty-six employees in Livingston would lose their jobs.  Jabil laid off approximately 400 people in September of 2016, 100 of those being corporate employees located in St. Petersburg Florida.

Business areas
Jabil customers span numerous industries, including healthcare, life sciences, clean technology, instrumentation, defense, aerospace, automotive, computing, storage, consumer products, networking and telecommunications. Its services include design engineering, manufacturing and supply chain services for the EMS and consumer industries; and materials technology services (plastics, metals, automation and tooling). Jabil diversifies their business into three areas.

Services

Design engineering
Jabil is involved in design engineering services. The company has industrial design services that concentrate on designing the look and feel of enclosures for printed circuit board assemblies and systems. Jabil's mechanical design services include dimensional design and analysis of electronic and optical assemblies. Computer-assisted design from Jabil includes testing and verification for printed circuit board assembly design and other consulting services. Jabil has assisted many Fortune 500 companies with design and engineering.

Supply chain and logistics
Jabil provides supply chain and logistic services. These services include electronic sourcing, virtual/vertical mechanics, logistics, supply chain management, advanced planning, quality, standardized global systems, supply chain solutions, and business analytics. The company's supply chain and logistics management were seen during Japan's 2011 Tōhoku earthquake and tsunami. When supply chain disruption occurred, Jabil re-routed supply from alternative sources, allocated limited production to key customers and distributors, specify and quality alternative parts, and called on existing suppliers to help reduce the impact of the disruptions. Jabil was able to do the same during the 2010 and 2011 Thailand floods.

Company culture

Jabil's company culture uses the concept of lean manufacturing. In September 2011, Jabil hosted 14,000  Kaizen Blitz events. Kaizen is a Japanese term for improvement, and Kaizen events focus on projects that aim to improve processes. Many of Jabil's senior leaders are currently undergoing or have already achieved  Six Sigma Black Belt Certification (a Jack Welch principle).

Jabil also holds an annual improvement competition known as "Deliver Best Practices." This is a company-wide (and worldwide) competition to recognize, support, and promote process advancements within the company. Employee teams enter innovative and cost-saving projects into the Deliver Best Practices competition. After several rounds, the top twenty-four projects from the global teams win a trip to Jabil's corporate offices and present their projects to company executives in person. One project in four different categories is chosen, and the team receives a $10,000 prize.

Social and environmental responsibility
Jabil is involved in both social and environmental responsibility. Jabil employs a director of social and environmental responsibility as part of their company who also serves on the board of directors for the Electronic Industry Citizenship Coalition.
Jabil is also involved with a charity and non-profit organizations outside of the Tampa / St. Petersburg area. They are a donor for the Guadalajara Los Pinos Boys Shelter in Los Pinos, Mexico. In Japan, Jabil Gotemba employees harvest and sell fruits to Jabil employees and use the proceeds to purchase and donate wheelchairs to the Gotemba community. Jabil employee Rick Smiley climbed Mt. Kilimanjaro in 2011 to raise money for charity. He raised funds and went to an orphanage in Kenya called "New Hope."

As part of the company's global initiative, more than 7,000 Jabil employees donated money to help the victims of the 2011 earthquake and tsunami in Japan. Jabil Green Point Wuxi and  Wuxi Konggang Industrial Park teamed up to build the Shuofang Agricultural Sanatorium for the Disabled and the Health and Happiness Garden. The facility opened on May 15, 2012.

Awards and recognition
Jabil has been the recipient of many awards and recognition. It was the first-ever recipient of the Mexican government's National Quality Award, which was given to it in 2006. This award is given to organizations recognized for their total quality management practices.

The company was awarded the Excellence in Best Practices Award from Frost & Sullivan in 2009. The company also received an HR award in Poland and a NEC Solution America's Favored Supplier Award. Jabil was awarded with the 2010 Save Energy Now Award by the United States Department of Energy.

Jabil made the list of Newsweek S&P 500 Green Companies in 2011. It was the 3rd consecutive year for Jabil to be on the list, improving each year from number 200 to number 127 in 2011. They were also given the 2010-2011 Annual Enterprise of Harmonious Labor Relation of Guangzhou City award.

In 2012, Jabil was recognized by Fortune Magazine as one of the Fortune 500 Most Admired Companies Jabil was also awarded the 2012 Kaizen Award in China by 1MFG and Masaaki lmai's Kaizen Institute Consulting Group (KICG). In 2012, Tim Main, former CEO and current chairman of the board, and Bill Morean, former chairman of the board of directors, won Entrepreneur of the Year Awards from Ernst & Young, LLC for the Florida region.
Jabil Circuit Shanghai received the Institute of Engineers Lean Best Practice Award in 2014, an award given in recognition of innovation and Lean Six Sigma capabilities.
Jabil Singapore received the prestigious ASQ ITEA Silver Award and First Place Winner for Institute of Industrial Engineers Annual Lean Best Practice Award in 2016.

Acquisitions and expansion
Jabil has acquired numerous companies and arms of companies. Their acquisitions have helped them expand their presence in countries such as China, Mexico, India, Spain, the Netherlands and Russia to name a few. In 2011, Jabil opened a Photovoltaic Certification and Testing Laboratory in St. Petersburg, FL. In February 2013, Jabil announced it would be purchasing Nypro for $665 million in cash. The purchase was completed in July 2013.

References

External links
 

Companies based in St. Petersburg, Florida
Manufacturing companies based in Florida
Electronics companies established in 1966
Companies listed on the New York Stock Exchange
Electronics manufacturing
Electronics companies of the United States
1966 establishments in Michigan
1993 initial public offerings